The Filmfare Best Female Playback Award is given by Filmfare as part of its annual Filmfare Awards for Hindi films, to recognise a female playback singer who has delivered an outstanding performance in a film song.

Although the award ceremony was established in 1954, the category for best playback singer was introduced in 1959. The award was initially common for both male and female singers until 1967. The category was divided the following year, and ever since there have been two awards presented for male and female singers separately.

Superlatives

[Asha Bhosle and Alka Yagnik with seven wins each , hold the record for most awards in this category. Shreya Ghoshal has won the award six times. Lata Mangeshkar, Anuradha Paudwal and Kavita Krishnamurthy have won the award four times. Bhosle won the award in a record of four consecutive years (1972–75), followed by the three consecutive wins of Paudwal (1991–1993), Krishnamurthy (1995–1997) and Yagnik (2000–2002), respectively.

Two singers have achieved the feat of receiving all the nominations of this category in a particular year: Asha Bhosle was the single nominee in 1973, having all the three nominations to her credit, and Alka Yagnik was the single nominee in 1994, having all the four nominations to her credit, one of which she shared—and eventually jointly won—with Ila Arun. 

In 1971, Lata Mangeshkar made the unusual gesture of not having her name be considered for the Filmfare Best Female Playback Award, in order to promote fresh talent. After receiving her seventh award in 1979, Asha Bhosle emulated her elder sister and requested that her name not be considered for the nominations thereafter.

There have been ties for two consecutive years between 2010 and 2011.

Until the award was not officially divided up for different gender (1968), Lata Mangeshkar was the only artist to win and be nominated for this award. She is also the earliest recipient of this award in 1959. Mangeshkar and Asha Bhosle were the most successful singers in 60s with two wins each. Bhosle continued her domination  in the 70s with five wins (Mangeshkar not considered from hereon). In 80s no singer dominated the epoch (Bhosle not considered from hereon); however in 90s Anuradha Paudwal and Kavita Krishnamurthy both had three wins each. Alka Yagnik and Shreya Ghoshal garnered four wins each in the 2000s. Rekha Bhardwaj and Shreya Ghoshal are leading the 2010s with two wins each.

Alka Yagnik holds the record of getting nominated for consecutively 14 years from 1992 till 2005, resulting in 33 nominations and 6 wins, followed by Shreya Ghoshal getting nominated consecutively for 11 years from 2006 to 2016 that resulted in 3 wins and 17 nominations.

Multiple winners

Most consecutive wins

Multiple nominees

Winners and nominees
In 1959, the award category for Best Playback Singer was first instituted after Lata Mangeshkar refused to perform the song "Rasik Balma Se Dil Kyon Lagaya" from the film Chori Chori by Shankar Jaikishan at the 3rd Filmfare Awards. Mangeshkar also became the first recipient of this award. Separate awards for male and female singers were introduced from 1968.

Note: The category for Best Playback Singer was established in 1959, and until 1967 both male and female singers used to compete for a single award.

1950s

1960s

1970s

1980s

1990s

2000s

2010s

2020s

See also
 Filmfare Award for Best Male Playback Singer
 Filmfare Awards
 Cinema of India

References

External links
 Filmfare Nominees and Winners
Filmfare Awards Best Female Playback Singer

Female Playback
Indian music awards